Pseudolithos caput-viperae is a species of succulent plant in the genus Pseudolithos. First discovered and described in the 1970s by botanists John Jacob Lavranos and Renato Bavazzano, it is native to Somalia. The seedlings of the plant are identical to Pseudolithos migiurtinus, but start to branch after a year, making this the only member of Pseudolithos that is not just a single squat stem. Its Latin species name means "snake head".

References

caput-viperae
Flora of Somalia
Plants described in 1974